Feliu-Joan Guillaumes i Ràfols (born 5 December 1962) is a Spanish politician from Catalonia and a former member of the Congress of Deputies of Spain.

Early life
Guillaumes was born on 5 December 1962 in Camprodon, Catalonia. He has lived in Mollet del Vallès since he was 7 years old. He has a degree in  philosophy and letters and a Master of Arts degree in senior management from the Generalitat de Catalunya.

Guillaumes joined the Democratic Convergence of Catalonia (CDC) in 1978 and was a member of its national executive committee from 1988 to 1996. He was one of the founders of the Nationalist Youth of Catalonia (JNC) of which he was president from 1991 to 1994. He was also one of the founders of the National Federation of Students of Catalonia (Federació Nacional d'Estudiants de Catalunya).

Career
Guillaumes was civil servant at the Generalitat de Catalunya and a human resources director for Sant Cugat del Vallès Municipal Council.

At the 1993 general election Guillaumes was placed 13th on the Convergence and Union (CiU) electoral alliance's list of candidates in the Province of Barcelona but the alliance only managed to win 10 seats in the province and as a result he failed to get elected to the Congress of Deputies. However he was appointed to the Congress of Deputies in December 1995 following the resignation of Rafael Hinojosa i Lucena.

Guillaumes contested the 1999 local elections as a CiU candidate in Mollet del Vallès and was elected. He was re-elected at the 2003, 2007 and 2011 local elections.

At the 2008 general election Guillaumes was placed 2nd on the CiU's list of candidates in the Province of Barcelona but the alliance only managed to win one seat in the province and as a result he failed to get elected to the Senate of Spain. He contested the 2011 general election as a CiU candidate in the Province of Barcelona and was re-elected to the Congress of Deputies.

At the 2015 general election Guillaumes was placed 6th on the Democracy and Freedom (DiL) electoral alliance's list of candidates in the Province of Barcelona but the alliance only managed to win 4 seats in the province and as a result he failed to get re-elected to the Congress of Deputies.

At the 2016 general election Guillaumes was placed 5th on the CDC's list of candidates in the Province of Barcelona but the party only managed to win 4 seats in the province and as a result he failed to get re-elected to the Congress of Deputies. However he was appointed to the Congress of Deputies in April 2017 following the disqualification of Francesc Homs i Molist.

Guillaumes is a member of Òmnium Cultural, Plataforma per la Llengua and Amnesty International.

Personal life
Guillaumes is married and has an adopted Chinese daughter.

Electoral history

References

1962 births
Catalan European Democratic Party politicians
Convergence and Union politicians
Democratic Convergence of Catalonia politicians
Living people
Members of the 5th Congress of Deputies (Spain)
Members of the 10th Congress of Deputies (Spain)
Members of the 12th Congress of Deputies (Spain)
Municipal councillors in the province of Barcelona
People from Ripollès